The second courtyard is one of four at Prague Castle, in Prague, Czech Republic. It features Kohl's Fountain.

External links

 

Prague Castle